Robert McBride may refer to:

Politics
 Robert McBride (Indiana judge) (1842–1926), Justice of the Indiana Supreme Court
 Robert McBride (politician) (1856–1934), Irish politician
 Robert H. McBride (1918–1983), United States Ambassador to Mexico

Music
 Robert McBride (composer) (1911–2007), American composer
 Bob McBride (1946–1998), lead vocalist for the Canadian popular music group Lighthouse

Others
 Robert McBride (poet) (died 1895), Irish-Canadian poet
 Robert McBride (police officer) (born 1963), police chief in South Africa; member of Umkhonto we Sizwe during the Apartheid era 
 Robert M. McBride (1879–1970), American publisher based in New York

See also 
 Heber Robert McBride (1843–1925), Mormon pioneer